Governor Wanton may refer to:

Gideon Wanton (1693–1767), Governor of the Colony of Rhode Island and Providence Plantations for two terms between 1745 and 1748
John Wanton (1672–1740), Governor of the Colony of Rhode Island and Providence Plantations from 1734 to 1740
Joseph Wanton (1705–1780), Governor of the Colony of Rhode Island and Providence Plantations from 1769 to 1775
William Wanton (1670–1733), Governor of the Colony of Rhode Island and Providence Plantations from 1732 to 1733